The Metro-Goldwyn-Mayer cartoon studio was an American animation studio operated by Metro-Goldwyn-Mayer (MGM) during the Golden Age of American animation. Active from 1937 until 1957, the studio was responsible for producing animated shorts to accompany MGM feature films in Loew's Theaters, which included popular cartoon characters Tom, Jerry, Droopy, Butch, Spike, Tyke, and Barney Bear.

Prior to forming its own cartoon studio, MGM released the work of independent animation producer Ub Iwerks, and later the Happy Harmonies series from Hugh Harman and Rudolf Ising. The MGM cartoon studio was founded to replace Harman and Ising, although both men eventually became employees of the studio. After a slow start, the studio began to take off in 1940 after its short The Milky Way became the first non-Disney cartoon to win the Academy Award for Best Short Subjects: Cartoons. The studio's roster of talent benefited from an exodus of animators from the Warner Bros. Cartoons and Disney studios, who were facing issues with union workers.

Originally established and run by executive Fred Quimby, William Hanna and Joseph Barbera, the  creators of the Tom and Jerry cartoons, became the heads of the studio in 1955 following Quimby's retirement. The cartoon studio was closed on May 15, 1957, at which time Hanna and Barbera took much of the staff to form their own company, Hanna-Barbera Productions, then named H-B Enterprises.

Turner Broadcasting System (via Turner Entertainment Co.) took over the library in 1986 after Ted Turner's short-lived ownership of MGM/UA. When Turner sold back the MGM/UA production unit, he kept the pre-1986 MGM library, including the Metro-Goldwyn-Mayer cartoons, for his own company. In 1996, Turner Broadcasting System merged with Time Warner, the parent company of Warner Bros., which currently owns the rights to the pre-1986 MGM library.

Background 
To promote their films and attract larger theater audiences, motion picture chains in the 1930s provided many features to supplement the main feature, including travelogues, serials, short comedy subjects, newsreels and cartoons. During the late 1920s, Walt Disney Productions had achieved huge popular and critical success with their Mickey Mouse cartoons for Pat Powers' Celebrity Pictures (distributing for Columbia Pictures). Several other studios, Metro-Goldwyn-Mayer among them, took note of Disney's success and began to look for ways to get Disney or compete. MGM had tried to get distribution rights to Mickey Mouse and Silly Symphony shorts from Pat Powers who was distributing them to Columbia Pictures.

MGM's first foray into animation was the Flip the Frog cartoon series, starring an anthropomorphic talking and singing frog. The series was produced independently for Celebrity Pictures by Ub Iwerks, formerly the head animator at the Disney studio. Celebrity Pictures' Pat Powers had hired Iwerks away from Disney with the promise of giving Iwerks his own studio, and was able to secure a distribution deal with MGM for the Flip the Frog cartoons. The first Flip the Frog cartoon, Fiddlesticks, was released in August 1930, and over two-dozen other Flip cartoons followed during the next three years. In 1933, the Flip character was dropped in favor of Willie Whopper, a new series featuring a lie-telling little boy. Willie Whopper failed to catch on, and MGM terminated its distribution deal with Iwerks and Powers, who had already begun distributing their Comi-Color cartoons on their own.

In February 1934, MGM signed a new deal with the Harman-Ising studio, which had just broken ties with producer Leon Schlesinger and the Warner Bros. studio over budget concerns, to work on a new series of high-budget color cartoons. The director team brought with them much of their staff from their time with Schlesinger, including animators and storymen such as Carmen "Max" Maxwell, William Hanna, and brothers Robert and Tom McKimson. (The McKimsons would later return to Schlesinger.) Also following Harman and Ising from Schlesinger was Bosko, a successful character the duo had created for the Warner cartoons. After learning from Disney's experiences with Oswald the Lucky Rabbit, Harman and Ising retained the rights to Bosko.

The first entry in MGM's new Happy Harmonies cartoon series, The Discontented Canary, was completed in June 1934 and released in September.  The series continued for three years, moving from two-strip to three-strip Technicolor in 1935.  The Happy Harmonies canon included a handful of entries starring Bosko, who by 1935 had been redesigned from an ambiguous "inkspot" character into a discernible little African-American boy.  The directors worked separately on their own films, although both strived to create intricate films that would compete with Disney's award-winning Silly Symphonies.

However, budget problems threatened to plague Harman and Ising a second time: Happy Harmonies cartoons regularly ran over budget, and Hugh Harman paid no heed to MGM's demands that he reduce the costs of the shorts. MGM retaliated in February 1937 by deciding to open their own cartoon studio, and hired away most of the Harman-Ising staff to do so. The final Happy Harmonies short, The Little Bantamweight, was released in March 1938, and Harman and Ising went on to establish a new studio to do freelance animation work for Walt Disney, only to come back.

For the 1934 MGM musical film Hollywood Party, Walt Disney Productions created an animated sequence in Technicolor called The Hot Choc-Late Soldiers, and is one of a few examples where Disney produced animation for other studios. The movie also contained a sequence with Jimmy Durante interacting with an animated Mickey Mouse.  

In 1936, Disney's animators were overworked with Snow White and the Seven Dwarfs and the Harman-Ising studio provided artists to work on the feature and the Silly Symphonies short Merbabies in exchange to artist training.

History

Early years (1937–1939) 
In March 1937, MGM hired film sales executive Fred Quimby, a man with no experience in the animation industry, to set up and run the new MGM cartoon department. Among the holdovers from the Harman-Ising regime, William Hanna and Bob Allen were appointed as directors and Carmen Maxwell became production manager. Quimby raided every major American animation studio for talent, extracting artists, directors and writers from studios, such as Friz Freleng from Leon Schlesinger Productions, Emery Hawkins from Screen Gems and much of the top staff at Terrytoons (Joseph Barbera, Jack Zander, Ray Kelly, Dan Gordon, George Gordon and others). After spending some time headquartered in a nearby house, the new MGM cartoon studio at Overland Ave. and Montana Ave. opened its doors on August 23, 1937.

Although it boasted a brand-new facility and good directors, the MGM cartoon studio's first series was a failure. The Captain and The Kids, adapted from Rudolph Dirks' Katzenjammer Kids characters, was licensed by MGM without input from its then-forming creative staff. Freleng, Hanna, and Allen, assigned to direct the Captain and the Kids cartoons, were unable to translate the Katzenjammer humor into animation, and the series folded after fifteen episodes. Only two of the Captain and the Kids shorts were produced in Technicolor; the other thirteen were produced in black-and-white and released in sepia-toned prints.

Harman and Ising return (1938–1943) 
MGM brought in established newspaper cartoonists such as Milt Gross and Harry Hershfield in an attempt to both bolster the Captain and the Kids product and create original properties for MGM, but both cartoonists' tenures at the studio were short-lived. Gross managed to complete two cartoons, Jitterbug Follies and Wanted: No Master, with his characters Count Screwloose of Tooloose and J.R. the Wonder Dog, while Hershfield completed no cartoons. 

In October 1938, Quimby, coming full-circle, hired Hugh Harman and Rudolf Ising as the new creative heads of the studio, acting as both directors and producers, and in charge of many of the employees who had defected from the Harman-Ising studio a year before.

Among Ising's first new cartoons for MGM was 1939's The Bear Who Couldn't Sleep, the debut appearance of Barney Bear, a lumbering anthropomorphic bear based upon both Wallace Beery and Ising himself. Barney Bear would become MGM's first original cartoon star, regularly featured in cartoons until 1953, although his popularity never rose to the level of  Mickey Mouse or  Porky Pig. Ising focused on the Barney Bear cartoons, while Harman focused on making intricately animated one-shot cartoons, although Harman was able to establish a short-lived series of Three Bears cartoons.

At this time, Harman created his masterwork, Peace on Earth. Released during the holiday season of 1939 (immediately after the outbreak of World War II in Europe), Peace on Earth was a serious work that dealt with the idea of what a post-apocalyptic world would be like. Peace on Earth was nominated for the 1939 Academy Award for Short Subjects (Cartoons), as well as for the Nobel Peace Prize.

Tom and Jerry (1939–1958) 

Friz Freleng, briefly assigned to work under Harman, returned to Schlesinger after his MGM contract expired in April 1939, and storyman Joseph Barbera was united with director William Hanna to co-direct cartoons for Rudolf Ising's unit. The partnership between Hanna, and Barbera would last for more than six decades until Hanna's death in 2001. The duo's first cartoon together was 1940's Puss Gets the Boot, featuring an unnamed mouse's attempts to outwit a house cat named Jasper. Though released without fanfare, the short was financially and critically successful, earning an Academy Award nomination for Best Short Subject (Cartoons) in 1940. On the strength of the Oscar nomination and public demand, Hanna and Barbera were assigned to direct more cat-and-mouse cartoons, soon christening the characters Tom and Jerry. Puss Gets the Boot did not win the 1940 Academy Award for Best Cartoon, but another MGM cartoon, Rudolf Ising's The Milky Way did, making MGM the first studio to wrestle the Cartoon Academy Award away from Walt Disney.

Tom and Jerry quickly became MGM's most valuable animated property. The shorts were successful at the box office, many licensed products (comic books, toys, etc.) were released to the market, and the series would earn twelve more Academy Award for Short Subjects (Cartoons) nominations, with seven of the Tom & Jerry shorts going on to win the Academy Award: The Yankee Doodle Mouse (1943), Mouse Trouble (1944), Quiet Please! (1945), The Cat Concerto (1947), The Little Orphan (1949), The Two Mouseketeers (1952) and Johann Mouse (1953). Tom & Jerry was eventually tied with Disney's Silly Symphonies as the most-awarded theatrical cartoon series. Originally barred by Quimby from making a second cat-and-mouse short until the overwhelming success of Puss Gets the Boot demanded it, Hanna and Barbera and their team of animators, who included George Gordon, Jack Zander, Kenneth Muse, Irven Spence, Ed Barge, Ray Patterson, and Pete Burness, worked on nothing but Tom & Jerry cartoons from 1941 until 1955. Exceptions were half a dozen one-shot theatrical shorts, including Gallopin' Gals (1940), Officer Pooch (1941), War Dogs (1943), Good Will to Men (1955), and the last seven Tex Avery shorts featuring Droopy.

Key to the successes of Tom and Jerry and other MGM cartoons was the work of Scott Bradley, who scored virtually all of the cartoons for the studio from 1934 to 1957. Bradley's scores made use of both classical and jazz sensibilities. In addition, he often used songs from the scores of MGM's feature films, the most frequent of them being "The Trolley Song" from Meet Me in St. Louis and "Sing Before Breakfast" from Broadway Melody of 1936.

Tex Avery (1941–1953) 

Hugh Harman left the MGM studio in April 1942, and Rudolph Ising departed eighteen months later. George Gordon took over Ising's department, continuing work on the Barney Bear cartoons, but only completed three cartoons before he left the studio in 1943. In Harman's place, Quimby hired Tex Avery, an animation director known for his wild comedic style at the Schlesinger studio. Avery's first short for MGM was the World War II parody Blitz Wolf, which was nominated for the 1942 Academy Award for Short Subjects (Cartoons). While Avery had revolutionized cartoon humor at Schlesinger's, he went several steps further in his MGM works. Avery exaggerated his characters and situations wildly, and was noted for the precise and hard-edged timing of his gags.
Among Avery's most noted cartoons for MGM were slapstick comedies such as Red Hot Riding Hood (1943), Jerky Turkey (1945), Northwest Hounded Police (1946), King-Size Canary (1947), Little Rural Riding Hood (1949), and  Bad Luck Blackie (1949). While Avery preferred to focus on gags instead of characterization, he established several popular MGM cartoon characters, including Screwball "Screwy" Squirrel, the Of Mice and Men derived pair of George and Junior, and his best-known character, Droopy. Droopy, voiced by Bill Thompson (a.k.a. "Wallace Wimple" on NBC Radio's Fibber McGee and Molly show) debuted in 1943 with Dumb-Hounded. He appeared in several more Avery cartoons (including Northwest Hounded Police) before being officially given his own series in 1949 with Señor Droopy.

The influence of Avery's cartoons was felt across the animation industry; even Hanna and Barbera adapted their Tom and Jerry shorts to match the levels of madcap humor and violence in Avery's films. Avery's team included storymen Rich Hogan and Heck Allen, and animators such as Michael Lah, Ed Love, and Preston Blair, most famous for animating the sexy female singer in Red Hot Riding Hood and its follow-ups. In 1946, Quimby assigned Blair and Lah to direct a new series of Barney Bear cartoons, reversing the decision after three cartoons.

CinemaScope (1953–1957) 
Tex Avery was a perfectionist: he worked extensively on his films' stories and gags, revised his animators' drawings, and was even known to cut frames out of the final Technicolor answer print if he felt a gag had been animated too softly. The strain of overwork caused Avery to quit MGM in May 1950, after completing Rock-a-Bye Bear (not released until 1952 because of MGM's cartoon backlog). Former Walter Lantz and Disney director Dick Lundy were brought in to head Avery's unit. Lundy completed one Droopy cartoon and ten Barney Bear shorts before Avery returned in October 1951 and reassumed his role as director from Lundy, starting with Little Johnny Jet (released in 1953).

Avery directed eleven more cartoons for MGM, many of them showing the heavy influence of the style of the newly popular UPA studio in their designs. In March 1953, MGM temporarily closed down the cartoon unit, thinking that the growing trend for 3D films would bring an end to the animated cartoon. Avery himself did not leave the studio until June, working with co-director Michael Lah on two more cartoons, Deputy Droopy and Cellbound, which Lah completed with the Hanna and Barbera staff (working during the most part of 1953 for commercials, as a predecessor of H-B Enterprises) during the closure. Avery went on to join the Walter Lantz staff the following February, while Lah went on to do commercial animation work. Because of the backlog of completed MGM cartoons, the cartoons Avery completed during his second tenure at the studio were not released until after he left again; Cellbound was not released until 1955.

Meanwhile, after the studio reopened in 1954, budget cuts required Hanna and Barbera to reduce the level of detail in their Tom and Jerry shorts (a precursor of what was to come), and to also begin doing one "cheater" short per year composed mostly of footage from previously released cartoons. That year, Hanna and Barbera directed Pet Peeve, the first MGM cartoon in the new widescreen CinemaScope process, which had been was devised as a means to keep audiences attending movie theatres in the wake of the popularity of television. Pet Peeve, released in late 1954, was followed by a sporadic number of CinemaScope Tom and Jerrys, with several other Tom and Jerrys being dual-released in standard format and in CinemaScope. After Pecos Pest (released in 1955), all MGM cartoons were released in CinemaScope. Six previous MGM cartoons, among them Hugh Harman's Peace on Earth, were remade in CinemaScope. Like the original Peace on Earth in 1939, its 1955 remake, Good Will to Men, was nominated for the Academy Award for Best Short Subject (Cartoons).

Later years (1955–1957) 
Quimby retired in 1955, and Hanna and Barbera became the new heads of the studio. Michael Lah returned to the studio in 1955 to direct an animated sequence for the MGM feature Invitation to the Dance, and stayed on to supervise a new series of CinemaScope Droopy cartoons to accompany the new CinemaScope Tom and Jerry cartoons.

Lah's One Droopy Knight was nominated for the 1957 Academy Award for Best Short Subject (Cartoons). However, for the most part, both the 1955–1957 CinemaScope Droopy and Tom and Jerry cartoons had lost their appeal in the eyes of critics due to weaker stories and simplistic animation, which were the result of the budget cuts. To keep the studio alive, MGM had begun reissuing previously released cartoons since the 1940s, but later decided in late 1956 that, due to the reissued shorts bringing in as much revenue as the new shorts, it could save $600,000 a year by shutting down production on new shorts. Most of the reissued cartoons were Tom and Jerry, Droopy and shorts featuring Tex Avery's showgirl, Red. None of Tex Avery's Screwy Squirrel and George and Junior cartoons were reissued.

The studio was closed on May 15, 1957 (though the last cartoon made by the studio was released in 1958), and Hanna and Barbera took most of their unit and began producing television cartoons with their company Hanna-Barbera Productions. Hanna-Barbera first approached MGM to distribute their cartoons for television but was turned down. Columbia Pictures' Screen Gems picked up Hanna-Barbera's product, and the studio soon became the most successful producers of television animation in the world. MGM would later have Gene Deitch create a series of Tom and Jerry cartoons before contracting Chuck Jones and Les Goldman's Sib Tower 12 studio to create more Tom and Jerry shorts. Sib Tower 12 was absorbed by MGM in 1964 and was renamed MGM Animation/Visual Arts.

Legacy 
Many MGM cartoons have become fan favorites throughout the years due to their animation style, plot, humor, cartoon violence (specifically the Tom and Jerry shorts), music and (at times) sexual innuendos (with regards to shorts starring Red). Individual shorts such as To Spring (1936) and The Dot and the Line (1965) have been acclaimed for their artistic designs while others such as Screwball Squirrel (1944) and King-Size Canary (1947) are celebrated for their sheer lunacy. Though not as popular with the general public as the Disney or Warner Bros. cartoons, MGM cartoons are heavily studied and praised by film historians and members of the animation industry.
 
As of 2009, nearly all of the Hanna and Barbera-produced Tom and Jerry shorts are available on DVD under the Tom and Jerry Spotlight Collection, a series of three DVD box sets that were released from October 2004 to September 2007 (however, two cartoons are missing due to politically incorrect scenes, and several of the released ones are edited). Warner Home Video would later release the Tom & Jerry shorts as part of the Tom and Jerry Golden Collection series of DVD and Blu-ray boxsets, which started with the first volume being released October 25, 2011, with the shorts being presented uncut, restored, remastered, in chronological order, and for the Blu-ray version, in 1080p high definition. Moreover, a two-disc collection of all of Droopy's cartoons was released in May 2007. Rumors have floated around for years of a box set consisting of Tex Avery's MGM work, but nothing has been released besides the Spotlight and Golden box sets for Tom and Jerry and the Droopy collection in the United States, although all of Tex Avery's cartoons were released on DVD in France through Warner Home Video. However, in 2020, Tex Avery cartoons finally started being released on Blu-ray, when Warner Archive Collection made Tex Avery Screwball Classics Volume 1 this February with 19 of the cartoons. A second volume was announced in March and was released on December 15, 2020.

MGM Cartoon Studio Staff; 1937–1957

Producers 
 Hugh Harman (1939–1943)
 Rudolph Ising (1939–1943)
 Fred Quimby (1937–1955)
 William Hanna and Joseph Barbera (1955–1958)
 Michael Lah (1955-1958)

Directors 

 Tex Avery (1942–1957)
 Preston Blair (1947–1950) 
 Friz Freleng (1937–1939)
 George Gordon (1942–1945)
 Milt Gross (1937–1939)
 Michael Lah (1947–1950, 1954–1958)
 Dick Lundy (1952–1954)
 William Hanna (1938-1958)
 Joseph Barbera (1940-1958)
 Rudolf Ising (1939-1943)
 Hugh Harman (1939-1942)

Writers 
 Heck Allen
 Homer Brightman
 Jack Cosgriff
 Rich Hogan
 Cal Howard
 Carman Maxwell
 William Hanna
 Joseph Barbera

Animators 

 Ray Abrams
 Ed Barge
 Robert Bentley
 Richard Bickenbach
 Preston Blair
 Pete Burness
 Jack Carr
 George Gordon
 Emery Hawkins
 Michael Lah
 Bill Littlejohn
 Ed Love
 Kenneth Muse
 Bill Nolan
 Don Patterson
 Ray Patterson
 Ken Southworth
 Irven Spence
 Gil Turner
 Bill Tytla
 Carl Urbano
 Carlo Vinci
 Carman Maxwell
 Rudy Zamora
 Jack Zander

Layout and background artists 
 Ed Benedict
 Harvey Eisenberg
 Bob Kuwahara
 Gene Hazelton

Voice actors 

 William Hanna
 Sara Berner
 Mel Blanc
 Billy Bletcher
 Lucille Bliss
 Daws Butler
 Red Coffey
 Pinto Colvig
 Hans Conried
 June Foray
 Paul Frees
 Frank Graham
 Harry Lang
 Patrick McGeehan
 Cliff Nazarro
 Lillian Randolph
 Kent Rogers
 Bill Thompson
 Thea Vidale
 Martha Wentworth
 Gayne Whitman

Musical directors 
 Scott Bradley (1937–1958)
 Bert Lewis (1937–1939)
 Edward Plumb (1953)

Sound department 

 Fred McAlpin (1937-1948)
 Jim Faris (1948-1952)
 Lovell Norman (1952-1957)

Productions 

 Series
 The Captain and the Kids (1938–1939; directed by Bill Hanna, Bob Allen and Friz Freleng)
 Count Screwloose (1939; directed by Milt Gross)
 Barney Bear (1939–1944, 1947–1949, 1952–1954; directed by Rudolf Ising, George Gordon, Preston Blair, Michael Lah and Dick Lundy)
 Three Bears (also known as The Bear Family, 1939–1940; produced and directed by Hugh Harman)
 Tom and Jerry (1940–1958; produced and directed by Hanna and Barbera, 1961-1962; produced and directed by Gene Deitch and William L. Synder, 1963-1967; produced and directed by Chuck Jones)
 Homer Flea (1940, 1948; directed by Rudolf Ising and Tex Avery)
 Droopy (1943–1958; directed by Tex Avery, Dick Lundy and Michael Lah)
 Red Hot Riding Hood & The Wolf (1943–1949; directed by Tex Avery)
 Ol' Doc Donkey (1944-45; directed by George Gordon)
 Screwy Squirrel (1944–1946; directed by Tex Avery)
 George and Junior (1946–1948; directed by Tex Avery)
 Spike (1949–1952, 1955, 1957; directed by Tex Avery)
 Spike and Tyke (1957; produced and directed by Hanna and Barbera) 

 Live-action films with animated sequences
 Anchors Aweigh (1945; "The Worry Song" sequence with Gene Kelly and Jerry Mouse with a cameo by Tom Cat)
 Holiday in Mexico (1946; Animated title sequence)
 Dangerous When Wet (1953; Animated swimming sequence with Esther Williams and Tom & Jerry)
 Invitation to the Dance (1956; "Sinbad the Sailor" sequence)

See also 

 The Golden Age of American animation
 Turner Entertainment Co.
 Warner Bros. Animation
 Hanna-Barbera
 MGM Animation/Visual Arts
 Metro-Goldwyn-Mayer Animation

Notes

References 
 Barrier, Michael (1999). Hollywood Cartoons: American Animation in Its Golden Age. Oxford: Oxford University Press. .
 Maltin, Leonard (1980, rev. 1987) Of Mice and Magic: A History of American Animated Cartoons, New York: Plume Books. 
 Adams, T.R. (1991), Tom and Jerry: Fifty Years of Cat and Mouse, 

 
American companies established in 1937
American companies disestablished in 1957
Entertainment companies established in 1937
Mass media companies established in 1937
Mass media companies disestablished in 1957
American animation studios
Film studios in Southern California
Companies based in Culver City, California
Entertainment companies based in California
1937 establishments in California
1957 disestablishments in California
Cartoon Studio
Defunct American film studios
Defunct companies based in Greater Los Angeles
Articles containing video clips